Caffyn is a surname that may refer to:

Ben Caffyn (1879–1942), American baseball player
Billy Caffyn (1828–1919), English cricketer
Chaloner Caffyn (1891–1917), English ice hockey player
Marshall Caffyn (1892–1966), Australian rules footballer
Matthew Caffyn (1628–1714), British General Baptist preacher and writer
Nancy Caffyn (1934–2010), American politician
Paul Caffyn, New Zealand sea kayaker